Rhaphidozoum is a radiolarian genus reported in the subfamily Sphaerozoidae. The genus contains bioluminescent species. It is a genus of colonial radiolarians (as opposed to solitary).

Species
The following species are recognized:
 Rhaphidozoum pandora Haeckel, 1887

References

Radiolarian genera
Bioluminescent radiolarians